Teddy Heri Setiawan (born 21 April 1991) is an Indonesian professional footballer who plays as a goalkeeper for Liga 1 club Persikabo 1973.

Club career
Setiawan joined Indonesia Super League club Arema in November 2017. He was released in July 2018. Then he played for Martapura, Persiba Balikpapan and Babel United during 2018 and 2019.

In February 2020, Persiraja Banda Aceh confirmed that he will join to the club to compete in 2020 Liga 1. This season was suspended on 27 March 2020 due to the COVID-19 pandemic. The season was abandoned and was declared void on 20 January 2021.

References

External links
 
 Teddy Heri Setiawan at Liga Indonesia

1991 births
Living people
Indonesian footballers
Association football goalkeepers
Persik Kediri players
Arema F.C. players
Dewa United F.C. players
Persiba Balikpapan players
BaBel United F.C. players
Muba Babel United F.C. players
Persiraja Banda Aceh players
Persikabo 1973 players
Liga 1 (Indonesia) players
Liga 2 (Indonesia) players
People from Kediri (city)
Sportspeople from East Java